Echelon is an unincorporated community and census-designated place (CDP) located within Voorhees Township in Camden County, New Jersey, United States. As of the 2010 United States Census, the CDP's population was 10,743.

The Voorhees Town Center (formerly known as Echelon Mall) is located in Echelon. The mall offers  of shopping, with Boscov's as the only anchor store as of 2017, as well as the Voorhees Township municipal offices.

Geography
According to the United States Census Bureau, Echelon had a total area of 2.836 square miles (7.344 km2), including 2.812 square miles (7.283 km2) is land and 0.024 square miles (0.061 km2) is water (0.85%).

Demographics

Census 2010

Census 2000
As of the 2000 United States Census there were 10,440 people, 4,886 households, and 2,345 families living in the CDP. The population density was 1,419.3/km2 (3,681.6/mi2). There were 5,322 housing units at an average density of 723.5/km2 (1,876.8/mi2). The racial makeup of the CDP was 73.54% White, 10.12% African American, 0.18% Native American, 13.27% Asian, 0.02% Pacific Islander, 0.80% from other races, and 2.06% from two or more races. Hispanic or Latino of any race were 3.04% of the population.

There were 4,886 households, out of which 22.8% had children under the age of 18 living with them, 36.8% were married couples living together, 8.5% had a female householder with no husband present, and 52.0% were non-families. 43.6% of all households were made up of individuals, and 13.4% had someone living alone who was 65 years of age or older. The average household size was 2.09 and the average family size was 3.01.

In the CDP the population was spread out, with 19.8% under the age of 18, 8.1% from 18 to 24, 38.0% from 25 to 44, 20.2% from 45 to 64, and 13.9% who were 65 years of age or older. The median age was 36 years. For every 100 females, there were 90.9 males. For every 100 females age 18 and over, there were 86.4 males.

The median income for a household in the CDP was $49,410, and the median income for a family was $63,962. Males had a median income of $46,934 versus $36,556 for females. The per capita income for the CDP was $26,850. About 4.9% of families and 8.3% of the population were below the poverty line, including 6.9% of those under age 18 and 13.2% of those age 65 or over.

References

Census-designated places in Camden County, New Jersey
Voorhees Township, New Jersey